Nocardiopsis composta  is a bacterium from the genus of Nocardiopsis which has been isolated from a composting facility in Germany.

References

Further reading

External links
Type strain of Nocardiopsis composta at BacDive -  the Bacterial Diversity Metadatabase	

Actinomycetales
Bacteria described in 2002